Peter Philip Harris (19 December 1925 – 2 January 2003) was a footballer who played for Portsmouth in the 1940s and 1950s.

Harris was an outside right, and he played a crucial role in Pompey's Football league title-winning sides of 1948–49 and 1949–50.

He made 479 Football League appearances for Portsmouth, scoring 194 goals.

Only the competition from Stanley Matthews and Tom Finney, in an era before substitutions were introduced to the game, prevented Harris earning more than two caps for the England national football team. He made his England debut against Ireland in a 2–0 defeat in September 1949.

Career statistics

Source: Pompeyrama

References

External links 
England profile

1925 births
2003 deaths
Footballers from Portsmouth
Portsmouth F.C. players
English footballers
England international footballers
English Football League players
Association football wingers
English Football League representative players